First Class is a 1966 Burmese black-and-white drama film, directed by Tha Du starring Htun Wai, Myat Mon, Thaw Ta Swe and May Nwet.

Plot
A poor couple, Maung Htun (Htun Wai) and A Shwe (Myat Mon) received free first-class tickets to a film from a rich couple, Thaw Ta (Thaw Ta Swe) and Ma Nwet (May Nwet). To be able to present themselves well at first-class standards, they cost more than the usual ticket. A satirical comedy about people's hypocrisy and arrogance.

Cast
Htun Wai as Maung Htun
Myat Mon as A Shwe
Thaw Ta Swe as Thaw Ta
May Nwet as Ma Nwet
Kyi Maung as Kyi Maung

References

1966 films
1960s Burmese-language films
Films shot in Myanmar
Burmese black-and-white films
1966 drama films